Squadron No. 5 is a 1939 Soviet drama film directed by Abram Room.

Plot 
The authorities of Nazi Germany give the order to enter the territory of the Soviet Union. This order is immediately intercepted by Soviet intelligence, which as a result sends a huge number of Soviet aircraft, including Squadron No. 5, to bomb German airfields.

Cast 
 Yuri Shumsky as Front Commander
 Nikolai Garin as Mayor Pyotr Grishin
 Boris Bezgin as Captain Aleksandr Nesterov
 Sofiya Altovskaya as Olga Grishina
 Andrei Apsolon as Syoma Gnatenko
 Viktor Gromov as General Gofer
 Sergei Tsenin as General Khvat
 Nikolai Bratersky as Lieutenant Oberst
 Yakov Zaslavsky as Lieutenant Gorn
 L. Novikov as Lieutenant Vessel
 Viktor Dobrovolsky

References

External links 
 

1939 films
1930s Russian-language films
Soviet war drama films
1930s war drama films
Soviet black-and-white films
1939 drama films